Saturday Morning Flashback is a program airing from 9 AM until 12 noon Saturday mornings on Chicago radio station WXRT. It has aired continually in this time slot since 1985. The show, once  a four hour program hosted by former WXRT DJ Wendy Rice was reduced to three hours after her departure.
The show is now hosted by Frank E. Lee, Johnny Mars, and Annalisa Parziale on a rotating basis. Parziale joined the rotation in August 2022, replacing host Richard Milne several months after his resignation from the station. Parziale’s first show covered 1973, airing August 6, 2022.

The program features contributions from several other WXRT DJs including Lin Brehmer and Marty Lennartz, who provides the voice for Chicago's hometown movie critic "the regular guy". Each week, Saturday Morning Flashback highlights the key music and cultural events encompassing a single year from the rock and roll era. The years covered range from 1967 on into the late 2000s, with new years gradually added in chronological order; each year is typically featured once every six to nine months, but the choices fit no other predictable pattern. Beginning in 2021 some shows were split between two years, with each year receiving 90 minutes on air.  The most recent years covered were a split show of 2007/2008 on June 25, 2022 hosted by Johnny Mars;.

All show playlists are posted at the station’s Audacy hosted webpage and on social media after each show.

In 2006, WXRT announced that, after 21 years, Saturday Morning Flashback would air its final show on April 1. This "finale" would feature ads for XRT's new Saturday morning programming, including a radio version of Fox's hit TV show "24". This turned out to be nothing more than an elaborate April Fool's Day hoax and programming director Norm Winer addressed listeners at the end of the show to ensure them that this popular program would not go away any time soon.

References

External links
WXRT Saturday Morning Flashback home page

American music radio programs
1985 radio programme debuts
Saturday mass media
Chicago radio shows